The Mysterious Wall is a 1967 Soviet science fiction film directed by Irina Povolotskaya and Mikhail Sadkovich.

Plot
In the taiga a very strange phenomenon forms — a wall in the form of a dome about two kilometers in diameter from a foggy blanket that disappears and appears with a certain periodicity, and presumably constitutes a powerful electrostatic charge. This strange Wall attracts scientists who in the process of research find out that it causes the viewer to see different visions from the past.

Under the dome of the Wall is a research station, scientist Lomov (Lev Krugly) has been working there for the third month. Lomov believes that the Wall is an envoy of a different civilization, and, despite the futility of his attempts, continues to attempt contact. He, using a loan from a military locator, tries to transmit various pictures to the Wall and studies how it responds to them. The Wall reacts by causing hallucinations from the past life of locator operators, while the radar equipment burns out.

The authorities send there a friend of Lomov, Andrey (Irakli Uchaneyshvili) to replace him on duty, because he believes that Lomov has overtired himself and begins to fantasize that the Wall itself is an intelligent alien. Together with Andrei goes the bride Lomov, Lena (Tatyana Lavrova), and along the way to them the military attach senior sergeant Valya (Andrei Mironov). The sergeant was sent to prepare a broken locator for dismantling. All of them take an active part in discussions about what the Wall is, fix the locator, experiment with it, and come to the hypothesis that hallucinations are caused by Martians who are studying life on Earth in this way.

The culmination of the film is the moment when Lena during one of the phenomenon of mirages receives a clue that it is possible to make contact by entering the Wall. She tries to do it, but does not have time (the Wall closes), the comrades who come to watch observe this.

The expedition returns to Moscow with a report, where it gives a press conference at which journalists and scientists question Soviet scientists about the nature of the mysterious Wall.

Soviet scientists are beginning to prepare a new expedition from a large group of specialists for a detailed study of the Wall.

Cast

Lead roles
Lev Krugly - Yegor Lomov, scientist
Tatyana Lavrova - Lena, the bride of Lomov
Irakli Uchaneishvili - Andrei Iraklyevich Erdeli, scientist
Andrei Mironov - Valentin Karpukhin, Senior Sergeant

Episodic roles
Valentin Nikulin is a Canadian traveler
Alexander Zhorzholiani - Uncle George, a fellow villager of Andrei Erdeli
Nikolai Barmin is an officer
Elena Bratslavskaya - employee of the computer center
Valentin Kozlov
Mikhail Orlov - commandant
Sofya Davydova
Georgios Sovchis - a scientist at a press conference (credited as T. Sovkis)
George Tusuzov - Head of Computing Center
Revaz Khobua - a fellow villager of Andrei Erdeli
Evgeny Shutov - driver
Viktor Sysoev - Kukushkin, the boy from the planetarium
Sergei Golovanov - scientist at the press conference
Yuri Leonidov - scientist at the press conference
Alexander Orlov - scientist
Alexander Kaidanovsky - employee of the computer center (uncredited)
Anatoly Yabbarov - a sailor on the tanker (uncredited)

References

External links

Soviet science fiction films
1960s science fiction films
Mosfilm films